Collita okanoi is a moth of the  family Erebidae. It is found on the southern Kuriles (Kunashir, Shikotan) and in Japan (Hokkaido, Honshu, Kyushu).

The wingspan is 28–32 mm. The ground colour of the wings is brown-grey. The forewing costal streak is yellow and wider in the basal half. The hindwings are coloured evenly and are paler than the forewings.

References

Moths described in 1961
Lithosiina
Moths of Japan